Lu Ching-yao (born 7 June 1993) is a Taiwanese badminton player. He was the silver medalist at the 2011 Asian Junior Championships, and 2015 Summer Universiade. He won his first senior international title at the 2014 Singapore International Series tournament in the men's doubles event partnered with Huang Po-jui. Lu educated at the University of Taipei, department of Ball Sports.

Achievements

Summer Universiade 
Mixed doubles

Asian Junior Championships 
Boys' doubles

BWF World Tour (1 title, 2 runners-up) 
The BWF World Tour, which was announced on 19 March 2017 and implemented in 2018, is a series of elite badminton tournaments sanctioned by the Badminton World Federation (BWF). The BWF World Tours are divided into levels of World Tour Finals, Super 1000, Super 750, Super 500, Super 300 (part of the HSBC World Tour), and the BWF Tour Super 100.

Men's doubles

BWF Grand Prix (3 runners-up) 
The BWF Grand Prix had two levels, the BWF Grand Prix and Grand Prix Gold. It was a series of badminton tournaments sanctioned by the Badminton World Federation (BWF) which was held from 2007 to 2017.

Men's doubles

  BWF Grand Prix Gold tournament
  BWF Grand Prix tournament

BWF International Challenge/Series (5 titles, 3 runners-up) 
Men's doubles

Mixed doubles

  BWF International Challenge tournament
  BWF International Series tournament
  BWF Future Series tournament

References

External links 
 

1993 births
Living people
Sportspeople from Kaohsiung
Taiwanese male badminton players
Badminton players at the 2018 Asian Games
Asian Games bronze medalists for Chinese Taipei
Asian Games medalists in badminton
Medalists at the 2018 Asian Games
Universiade medalists in badminton
Universiade silver medalists for Chinese Taipei
Medalists at the 2015 Summer Universiade
21st-century Taiwanese people